Evan Bradley Mathis (born November 1, 1981) is a former American football offensive guard who played in the National Football League (NFL). He played college football at Alabama, and was drafted by the Carolina Panthers in the third round of the 2005 NFL Draft. Mathis has also played for the Miami Dolphins, Cincinnati Bengals, Philadelphia Eagles and Denver Broncos.

Early years
Mathis graduated from Homewood High School in Homewood, Alabama, where he played football and competed in track and wrestling. He was coached by Bob Newton in football. In wrestling, Mathis won the 2000 Alabama 6A heavyweight championship. In track & field, Mathis competed in the shot put event (top-throw of 15.24 meters).

College career
In April 2001, he was named the Paul Crane Most Improved Offensive Lineman for Alabama along with tight end Theo Sanders. He competed with Alonzo Ephraim for the starting center job during spring practice in 2001, but lost out. Instead, he beat out Dante Ellington for the starting right tackle job, making his first start against South Carolina.

Mathis started four seasons on the offensive line for the University of Alabama Crimson Tide. His first three years he played tackle, before shifting to left guard as a senior. He started 47 consecutive games beginning in the 4th game of his redshirt freshman year.  He helped anchor an offensive line that paved the way for the Crimson Tide to lead the Southeastern Conference in rushing yards per game in 2004.

Professional career

Miami Dolphins
Mathis was signed by the Miami Dolphins on September 9, 2008, after Donald Thomas, their rookie starting right guard spot was put on injured reserve. The Dolphins released him November 8 after playing seven games for them.

Cincinnati Bengals
Mathis played for the Cincinnati Bengals from 2008 to 2010. He did not allow a sack during the 2009 and 2010 seasons.

Philadelphia Eagles
The Philadelphia Eagles signed Mathis to a one-year contract on July 31, 2011. Immediately after the preseason, Mathis won the starting job at left guard for the 2011 season. He signed a five-year, $25.5 million contract with the Eagles on March 17, 2012.

Pro Football Focus rated Mathis as the best guard in the NFL for the 2011, 2012, and 2013 season. In 2014, he was rated as the second best guard in the league despite missing seven games due to injury.

Mathis was named to the USA Today All-Pro Team after the 2012 season.

Ranked #6 overall in Pro Football Focus' Top 101 of 2012. In 2013, Pro Football Focus chose Mathis for its inaugural Bruce Matthews Award recognizing the NFL's best offensive lineman. He was voted First-team All-Pro in 2013 for his excellent performance with Philadelphia.

Mathis was released by the team on June 11, 2015, after he held out of OTAs in search of a new contract.

Denver Broncos
On August 25, 2015, Mathis agreed to a one-year, $2.5 million contract with the Denver Broncos. On February 7, 2016, Mathis won his first career Super Bowl when the Broncos beat the Carolina Panthers 24–10 in Super Bowl 50.

Arizona Cardinals
Mathis signed a one-year, $6 million contract with the Arizona Cardinals on March 16, 2016. He was placed on injured reserve on October 8, 2016, after suffering an ankle injury in Week 5 against the San Francisco 49ers. Mathis announced his retirement via Twitter on January 20, 2017.

Personal life

Mathis's uncle is Bob Baumhower, who played defensive tackle for Alabama and the Miami Dolphins. Mathis and previous wife Katelynn coparent 2 daughters. Mathis married Megan Mathis in late 2022. 

On April 19, 2018, Mathis sold a 1952 Topps Mickey Mantle baseball card via Heritage Auctions for $2.88 million. At the time, it was the second-highest sale price for a trading card ever, behind only the T206 Honus Wagner.

Mathis finished 35th at the 2019 PokerStars Players No Limit Hold’em Championship (PSPC).

References

External links

Arizona Cardinals bio
Philadelphia Eagles bio
Cincinnati Bengals bio

1981 births
Living people
People from Homewood, Alabama
Players of American football from Birmingham, Alabama
American football offensive tackles
American football offensive guards
Alabama Crimson Tide football players
Carolina Panthers players
Miami Dolphins players
Cincinnati Bengals players
Philadelphia Eagles players
Denver Broncos players
Arizona Cardinals players
Unconferenced Pro Bowl players